Tsukioka Yoshitoshi (1839–1892) was a Japanese woodblock print artist. 

Yoshitoshi is a masculine Japanese given name. Other notable people with the name include: 
 Yoshitoshi ABe (born 1971), graphic artist
 Yoshitoshi Mori (1898–1992),  stencil prints artist
 Sō Yoshitoshi (1568–1615), daimyō of Tsushima
 Yoshitoshi Tokugawa (1884–1963), lieutenant general in the Imperial Japanese Army and one of the pioneers of aviation in Japan

Other uses 
 Yoshitoshi Recordings, house music label owned and operated by Deep Dish

Japanese masculine given names